Endel is an Estonian masculine given name and may refer to:
Endel Aruja (1911-2008), Estonian physicist active in Canada
Endel Eero (1930–2006), Estonian politician
Endel Edasi (1929–2002), Estonian swimmer
Endel Kiisa (born 1937), Estonian motorcycle rider
Endel Laas (1915- 2009), Estonian forest scientist and professor
Endel Lippmaa (1930-2015), Estonian physicist, academian and politician
Endel Nelis (1925–1993), Estonian fencer and fencing coach
Endel Nirk (1925–2018), Estonian literary scientist, critic and writer
Endel Pärn (1914–1990), Estonian actor and singer 
Endel Press (1929–1982), Estonian swimmer 
Endel Puusepp (1909–1996), Estonian Soviet World War II pilot
Endel Ratas (1938–2006), Estonian freedom fighter and politician
Endel Redlich (1923–1949), Estonian partisan
Endel Rikand (1906–1944), Estonian sport shooter
Endel Rivers (born 1959), Estonian-Australian musician, composer and music producer
Endel Ruberg (1917–1989), Estonian-born Canadian artist
Endel Taniloo (1923–2019), Estonian sculptor
Endel Tulving (born 1927), Estonian-born Canadian experimental psychologist and cognitive neuroscientist
Endel may also refer to:

 Endel (app), a generative music app that creates personalized sound environments to match user activities

References

Estonian masculine given names